Amsterdam is the capital and largest city of the Kingdom of the Netherlands.

Amsterdam may also refer to:

Places

United States
Amsterdam, California, a community
Amsterdam, Georgia, an unincorporated community
Amsterdam, Missouri, a city in Missouri
Amsterdam, Montana, an unincorporated community
Amsterdam, New Jersey, an unincorporated community
Amsterdam (town), New York, a town
Amsterdam (city), New York, a city within the town
Amsterdam station (New York), a train station in Amsterdam (city), New York
Amsterdam, Ohio, a village in Jefferson County, Ohio
Amsterdam, Licking County, Ohio, an unincorporated community
Amsterdam, Pennsylvania, an unincorporated community
Amsterdam, Texas, an unincorporated community
Amsterdam, Virginia, an unincorporated community
Amsterdam Avenue (Manhattan), a street in New York City

Other places
Amsterdam, Mpumalanga, a town in Mpumalanga, South Africa
Amsterdam, Saskatchewan, a hamlet in Saskatchewan, Canada
Fort Amsterdam, Ghana, a sea-side fort and World Heritage Site in Kormantin, Ghana

Ships
, ships named Amsterdam, owned by the Dutch East India Company and its pre-companies
, a cruise ship owned and operated by Holland America Line
Stad Amsterdam, a historical clipper reconstruction
, warships of the Royal Netherlands Navy
, a Cleveland-class light cruiser
, later redesignated to CL-59, an Independence-class aircraft carrier
, a number of merchant ships

Literature and media
Amsterdam (novel), a 1998 novel by Ian McEwan
Amsterdam (Killmaster novel), a 1968 novel in the Nick Carter-Killmaster series
"Hamsterdam", a 2004 episode of The Wire, was called "Amsterdam" on the first DVD release
Amsterdam (1964 film), a Dutch film directed by Herman Van Der Horst
Amsterdam (2009 film), a Dutch film directed by Ivo van Hove
Amsterdam (2013 film), a Canadian film directed by Stefan Miljevic
Amsterdam (2022 film), an American film directed by David O. Russell
 Amsterdam Vallon, a character played by Leonardo DiCaprio in the movie Gangs of New York

People
Jane Amsterdam (b. 1951), American news and magazine editor
Morey Amsterdam (1908–1996), an American comedian
Robert Amsterdam (born 1956), a Canadian international lawyer
Saul Amsterdam (1898–1937), a Polish communist
Sibori Amsterdam ( 1654–1690), 12th Sultan of Ternate
Anthony G. Amsterdam, "Tony" Amsterdam, law professor

Music

Performers
Amsterdam (band), a pop band from the UK

Albums
Amsterdam (The Lofty Pillars album)
Amsterdam (Phish album)
Amsterdam '08, a compilation album by Markus Schulz

Songs
"Amsterdam" (Jacques Brel song), a song by Jacques Brel
"Amsterdam" (Maggie MacNeal song). a song by Maggie MacNeal
"Amsterdam" (Guster song), a song by Guster
"Amsterdam" (Van Halen song), a song by Van Halen
"Amsterdam" (Imagine Dragons song), a song by Imagine Dragons
"Amsterdam", a song from the album God Forgives, I Don't by Rick Ross
"Amsterdam", a song from the album Wedding Album by John Lennon and Yoko Ono
"Amsterdam", a song from the album A Rush of Blood to the Head by Coldplay
"Amsterdam", a song from the album Intriguer by Crowded House
"Amsterdam", a song from the album Writer's Block by Peter Bjorn and John
"Amsterdam", a song from the album Ode to Ochrasy by Mando Diao
"Amsterdam", a song from the album Play Me Backwards by Joan Baez
"Amsterdam", a song from the album Colours by Nadia Oh
"Amsterdam", a song from the Broadway musical Passing Strange by Stew and Heidi Rodewald
"Amsterdam", a song from the album Broken Machine by Nothing But Thieves
"Amsterdam", a song from the album Qui by Michèle Torr
"Amsterdam", a song from the album The Weatherman by Gregory Alan Isakov

Other
Amsterdam station (disambiguation), stations of the name
FC Amsterdam, a former Dutch association football club
.amsterdam, a top-level domain for the city of Amsterdam
 New York Amsterdam News American weekly newspaper

See also
New Amsterdam (disambiguation)
The Amsterdams, Romanian rock band
Amsterdam Island (disambiguation)